The Paramount, or 680 Mission Street at Third, is a 40-story rental-apartment tower that is located South of Market just outside the Financial District on Mission Street in San Francisco.

History

Construction of the 420-foot (128-m) tower was completed in 2001. Upon completion, the building was the tallest concrete-framed structure located in Seismic Zone 4. It was also the tallest all-residential building in San Francisco from 2001 to 2008.

The Paramount is one of several new highrise projects completed or under construction on Mission Street since 2000. Other examples include 555 Mission Street, St. Regis Museum Tower, Millennium Tower, 101 Second Street, and the JP MorganChase Building.

UC Santa Cruz chancellor Denice Denton leapt to her death from the roof on 24 June 2006.

See also

List of tallest buildings in San Francisco

References

External links
Official website

Residential buildings in San Francisco
Residential buildings completed in 2002
Residential skyscrapers in San Francisco
Residential condominiums in San Francisco
South of Market, San Francisco
2002 establishments in California
2002 in San Francisco